Lok Fu is a station on the Hong Kong MTR . It was opened on 1 October 1979 as part of the Modified Initial System (MIS; now Kwun Tong line), the first part of the MTR.

History
The station was opened when Modified Initial System was put into use on 1 October 1979.

Station layout

Entrances/exits
A: Lok Fu Place (UNY) 
B: Lok Fu Place Zone B

Gallery

References

MTR stations in Kowloon
Kwun Tong line
Lok Fu
Wong Tai Sin District
Railway stations in Hong Kong opened in 1979